Nimruz County is in Sistan and Baluchestan province, Iran. The capital of the county is the city of Adimi. At the 2006 census, the county's population (as Posht Ab District of Zabol County) was 40,434 in 8,737 households. The following census in 2011 counted 45,466 people in 10,786 households. At the 2016 census, the county's population was 48,471 in 12,700 households, by which time the district had been separated from the county to form Nimruz County.

Administrative divisions

The population history and structural changes of Nimruz County's administrative divisions over three consecutive censuses are shown in the following table. The latest census shows two districts, four rural districts, and one city.

References

 

Counties of Sistan and Baluchestan Province